Noblesse oblige is a French phrase meaning "nobility obliges".

Noblesse Oblige may also refer to:

Books
Noblesse Oblige (book), a 1956 humorous book on U and non-U English, nominally edited by Nancy Mitford
"Noblesse Oblige" (short story), a 1934 short story by P. G. Wodehouse
Noblesse oblige, an 1851 novel by César Lecat de Bazancourt

Film and TV
Noblesse oblige, the French title of the 1949 film Kind Hearts and Coronets
"Noblesse Oblige" (Justified), a 2015 episode of Justified
"Noblesse Oblige" (Upstairs, Downstairs), a 1975 episode of Upstairs, Downstairs
"Noblesse Oblige", a 5th episode of 2nd season of Freezing
Noblesse Oblige (TV series), a 2014 Hong Kong TV series

Music
Noblesse Oblige (band), a British punk rock duo
Noblesse Oblige (album), a 2012 album by the Italian band Punkreas
"Noblesse Oblige", also known as Opus #5 Adagio Contabile, an instrumental track on The Crest by Axel Rudi Pell